A marina is a place for docking pleasure boats.

Marina may also refer to:

Places

Italy 
Bova Marina
 Cirò Marina
 Isca Marina
 Marciana Marina
 Marina di Bibbona
 Marina di Camerota
 Marina di Campo
 Marina di Campo Airport
 Marina di Casalvelino
 Marina di Castagneto Carducci
 Marina di Carrara
 Marina di Cecina
 Marina di Gioiosa Ionica
 Marina di Grosseto
 Marina di Massa
 Marina di Pietrasanta
 Marina di Pisa
 Marina di Posada
 Marina di Ragusa
 Marina di Scilla
 Rio Marina
 Sellia Marina
 Vibo Marina

Singapore
 Marina Bay, Singapore
 Marina Square, a shopping mall in Singapore

Spain
 Marina Alta, a comarca in the province of Alicante, Spain
 Marina Baixa (Spanish: Marina Baja), a comarca in the province of Alicante, Spain

United States
 Marina, California, a small city on the central coast of California
 Marina, San Diego, California, a neighborhood in San Diego
 Marina Club, a neighborhood in Tampa, Florida
 Marina del Rey, California, a small town on the coast of southern California, near Los Angeles 
 Marina District, San Francisco, California

Elsewhere
 Marina, Croatia, a municipality and tourist town on the Adriatic
 Marina, Egypt, a Mediterranean beach and resort village
 Marina, Estonia, a village in Saarde Parish, Pärnu County, Estonia
 1202 Marina, an asteroid
 Marina Beach, a beach in Chennai, India
 Marina Point, a low rocky point of Galindez Island, Antarctica
 Dubai Marina, a place in Dubai

People
 Marina (given name)

Mononym
 Marina Diamandis (born 1985), Welsh singer-songwriter known as Marina (stylised as MARINA)
 Marina (Japanese singer) (born 1987), real name Marina Nakamura
 Marina (Polish singer) (born 1989), stylised as MaRina, real name Marina Łuczenko-Szczęsna

Surname 
 Alcide Marina (1887–1950), Catholic educator and Vatican diplomat 
 Alfonso Marina, American soccer player
 Anya Marina (born 1976), American singer and songwriter
 Justinian Marina (1901–1977), Romanian Orthodox prelate 
 Roberto Marina (born 1961), Spanish football player

Spanish surname variants 
 Fernando de Andrade de las Mariñas (1477–1549), Galician nobleman and military commander
 Luis Mariñas (1947–2010), Spanish journalist

Arts, entertainment, and media

Films
 Marina (1945 film), a 1945 Mexican comedy film
 Marina (1960 film), a 1960 German musical film
 Marina (2012 film), a 2012 Tamil-language film
 Marina (2013 film), a 2013 Flemish film about the Belgian artist Rocco Granata

Television
 Marina (1974 TV series), a Mexican telenovela
 Marina (2004 TV series), a Philippine TV series
 Marina (2006 TV series), a Spanish-language TV series

Other arts, entertainment, and media
 "Marina" (Rocco Granata song), 1959
 "Marína", a 19th-century poem by Slovak author Andrej Sládkovič (Andrej Braxatoris)
 Marina Records, a record label
 Marina (novel), a 1999 young adult fiction novel by Carlos Ruiz Zafón

Biology
 Marina (plant), a genus of legumes
 Blechnum penna-marina (the pinque), a fern species from Chile and Argentina

Brands and enterprises
 Morris Marina, a British car 
 Marina Hotel, a former hotel/casino in Las Vegas

Maritime 
 Marina (ship), a number of ships
 "Marina" means "navy" in Italian and Spanish:
 Marina de Guerra Revolucionaria, the Cuban Navy
 Marina de guerra de Guinea Ecuatorial, the Equatoguinean Navy
 Marina Militare, the Italian Navy
 Real Marina (Kingdom of the Two Sicilies)
 Marina Nazionale Repubblicana, Navy of the Italian Social Republic (1943-1945)
 Marina de Guerra del Peru, the Peruvian Navy
 Marina de Guerra de la República Española, the former Spanish Republican Navy (1931-1939)

Other uses 
 MARINA, an NSA database
 Maritime Industry Authority (Philippines), abbreviated as MARINA

See also
 
 Marine (disambiguation)
 Mariner (disambiguation)
 Marines
 Marina Bay (disambiguation)
 Marinha de Guerra (disambiguation)